Crane Hill is an unincorporated community in Cullman County, Alabama, United States, located in the southwestern portion of the county. The community of Crane Hill traces its history back to 1806, when the first settlers recorded their land titles. The area is named after the Sandhill Crane who fished the streams and roosted on a hill located just north of Mt. Zion Road.

Crane Hill
The Crane Hill community consists of several businesses and the following government buildings.
 Four volunteer fire departments
 One senior center
 One Post Office (35053)
 One public park (Dowling Memorial Park)
 No traffic lights

The area is nestled at the foot of the Appalachian Mountains, it offers a landscape of rock outcrops and meadows endowed with indigenous plants, wild flowers and a variety of wild animals. Smith Lake and many fresh water streams wind through the hills and rocks offering residents and visitors recreational opportunities.

Crane Hill School
 In 1904, Crane Hill Jr. High School was built and is now the Masonic Lodge, which was relocated to its present site in 1934. That same year the school it was replaced by a brick structure and was known as Crane Hill School.
 In 1938, the school was destroyed by fire that was reported to have been started by an electrical problem.
 In 1939, the citizens of Crane Hill built a new brick school using trees on site and a saw mill owned by Ivan Williams.  Once completed the school was named after the then current superintendent of Education in Cullman County, H.G. Dowling.
 On Labor Day 1996, Dowling Junior High School was vandalized and burnt to the ground and was never rebuilt.

Dowling Memorial Park
After the fire of 1996, the citizens of Crane Hill once again try to raise money to rebuild the school, but the Cullman County Board of Education did not see a need at the time for a school at the location. In 1997 an effort to raise money led to the start the Sweet Tater Festival. This Festival has moved to Smith Lake Park in recent years.

Churches
Mt. Hope Baptist Church is notably the oldest church in Crane Hill. The first church was built in 1877, the same year Cullman County came into existence. In 1923, the church was destroyed by a fire but was rebuilt in 1962.
 Sulphur Springs Baptist Church
 Flat Rock United Methodist Church
 Livingston Chapel Church
 Beulah Church of the Nazarine
 Holy Ground Baptist Church (Formerly called the New Mt.Zion Baptist Church)

Historic buildings
 Crane Hill Masonic Lodge is listed on both the Alabama Register of Landmarks and Heritage and the National Register of Historic Places.

Additional facts
 County Road 222 is the main road that goes through Crane Hill.
 The crime rate in the community is very low.
 The community has several bed-and-breakfasts:
 Anchor Light Bed & Breakfast Lighthouse
 Smith Lake Bed & Breakfast

Demographics
 European American population: 2,467
 African American population: 0
 Native American population: 10
 Asian ancestry population: 3
 Native Hawaiian and Other Pacific Islander population: 4
 Some other race population: 1
 Two or more races population: 12

References

Unincorporated communities in Alabama
Unincorporated communities in Cullman County, Alabama